Aleksander Onisimovich Ablesimov (— 1783) was a Russian opera librettist, poet, dramatist, satirist and journalist.

Biography
Worked as copyist for Alexander Sumarokov. Published his fables and satirical poems. Wrote the libretto for the early Russian-language opera by Mikhail Sokolovsky The miller who was a wizard, a cheat and a matchmaker (Мельник - колдун, обманщик и сват — Melnik - koldun, obmanshchik i svat 1779 Moscow, c.1795 St Petersburg), which was popular for three decades, and established a new operatic genre in Russia – a comedy about everyday life with spoken dialogue.

He also wrote libretti for two comic operas by M. Ekkel and a dramatic dialogue on the opening of Petrovka Theatre in Moscow.

Bibliography
Frolova-Walker, Marina: Russian Federation, 1730–1860, Opera in The Grove Dictionary of Music and Musicians, vol. 21 
Собрание сочинений изданное в одном томе Смирдиным (неполное), СПБ.
Полное собрание стихотворений (1849) в «Русской поэзии» под ред. С. А. Венгерова, т. I. — СПБ. 1897.
Венгеров С. А. Источники словаря русских писателей. т. I. — СПБ. 1900.
Венгеров С. А. Критическо—биографический словарь русских писателей и учёных. т. I. — СПБ. 1889.
Соч., СПБ. 1849; [Соч.], в кн.: Русская комедия и комическая опера XVIII в., М.—Л., 1950.
История русской литературы XVIII в. Библиографический указатель. Под ред. П. Н. Беркова, Л., 1968.
Энциклопедический словарь Брокгауза и Ефрона (1890—1907).

External links
Biography in Russian

Russian opera librettists
Journalists from the Russian Empire
Russian male journalists
Male writers from the Russian Empire
Poets from the Russian Empire
Russian male poets
Russian dramatists and playwrights
Russian male dramatists and playwrights
Russian satirists
1742 births
1783 deaths